Metodija Stepanovski (born 26 May 1983 in Bitola) is a retired Macedonian football defender.

References

1983 births
Living people
People from Bitola
Association football defenders
Macedonian footballers
North Macedonia under-21 international footballers
North Macedonia international footballers
FK Pelister players
FK Napredok players
Ionikos F.C. players
FK Rabotnički players
FK Renova players
FK Novaci players
Macedonian expatriate footballers
Expatriate footballers in Greece
Macedonian expatriate sportspeople in Greece
Macedonian First Football League players
Super League Greece players